Donatien Nonnotte (10 January 1708 – 4 February 1785) was a French painter who specialized in portraiture.

A native of Besançon, Nonnotte was received by the Académie royale de peinture et de sculpture in 1741 as a portrait painter.  In 1754, he moved to Lyon, where he obtained the title of "official painter" of the town in 1762. Most notably, he taught François-Hubert Drouais.

Gallery

References

1708 births
1785 deaths
Artists from Besançon
18th-century French painters
French male painters
French portrait painters
18th-century French male artists